Playlist: The Very Best of Ricky Martin is a greatest hits album released by Legacy Recordings, featuring a collection of Ricky Martin's English-language songs. It was released on October 9, 2012 as part of the Playlist compilation albums series.

Playlist: The Very Best of Ricky Martin contains Martin's English-language hits and two album tracks from the 2005 album, Life: "Save the Dance" and "Sleep Tight." It also includes "Shine" from Música + Alma + Sexo (2011) and an English-language version of "Más," titled "Freak of Nature" which was remixed by Ralphi Rosario.

Track listing

Release history

References

2012 greatest hits albums
Ricky Martin compilation albums